Boğazlıyan is a town and district of Yozgat Province in the Central Anatolia region of Turkey. Neighbouring districts are Sarıkaya on the north, Yenifakılı on the west, Çandır and Çayıralan on the east. According to 2000 census, population of the district is 67,184 of which 29,719 live in the town of Boğazlıyan.

Notes

References

External links
 District governor's official website 
 District municipality's official website 
 General information on Boğazlıyan 
 Image gallery of Boğazlıyan 
  Bogazliyan Anatolia Highschool Website 

Districts of Yozgat Province
Populated places in Yozgat Province